Chrysogorgia is a genus of soft corals in the family Chrysogorgiidae.

Species 
 Chrysogorgia abludo Pante & Watling, 2011  
 Chrysogorgia acanthella (Wright & Studer, 1889)  
 Chrysogorgia admete Bayer & Stefani, 1988  
 Chrysogorgia agassizii (Verrill, 1883)  
 Chrysogorgia anastomosans Versluys, 1902  
 Chrysogorgia antarctica Cairns, 2002  
 Chrysogorgia arborescens Nutting, 1908  
 Chrysogorgia artospira Pante & Watling, 2011  
 Chrysogorgia averta Pante & Watling, 2011  
 Chrysogorgia axillaris (Wright & Studer, 1889)  
 Chrysogorgia bracteata Bayer & Stefani, 1988  
 Chrysogorgia calypso Bayer & Stefani, 1988  
 Chrysogorgia campanula Madsen, 1944  
 Chrysogorgia cavea Kinoshita, 1913  
 Chrysogorgia chryseis Bayer & Stefani, 1988  
 Chrysogorgia comans Kinoshita, 1913  
 Chrysogorgia constricta Hiles, 1899  
 Chrysogorgia cupressa (Wright & Studer, 1889)  
 Chrysogorgia curvata Versluys, 1902  
 Chrysogorgia debilis Kükenthal, 1908  
 Chrysogorgia delicata Nutting, 1908  
 Chrysogorgia desbonni Duchassaing & Michelotti, 1864  
 Chrysogorgia dichotoma Thomson & Henderson, 1906  
 Chrysogorgia dispersa Kükenthal, 1908  
 Chrysogorgia electra Bayer & Stefani, 1988  
 Chrysogorgia elegans (Verrill, 1883)  
 Chrysogorgia excavata Kükenthal, 1908  
 Chrysogorgia expansa (Wright & Studer, 1889)  
 Chrysogorgia fewkesii Verrill, 1883  
 Chrysogorgia flavescens Nutting, 1908  
 Chrysogorgia flexilis (Wright & Studer, 1889)  
 Chrysogorgia fruticosa (Studer, 1894)  
 Chrysogorgia geniculata (Wright & Studer, 1889)  
 Chrysogorgia herdendorfi Cairns, 2001  
 Chrysogorgia indica Thomson & Henderson, 1906  
 Chrysogorgia intermedia Versluys, 1902  
 Chrysogorgia irregularis Thomson & Henderson, 1906  
 Chrysogorgia japonica (Wright & Studer, 1889)  
 Chrysogorgia laevorsa Cairns, 2018  
 Chrysogorgia lata Versluys, 1902  
 Chrysogorgia midas Cairns, 2018  
 Chrysogorgia minuta Kinoshita, 1913  
 Chrysogorgia mixta Versluys, 1902  
 Chrysogorgia multiflora Deichmann, 1936  
 Chrysogorgia octagonos Versluys, 1902  
 Chrysogorgia okinosensis Kinoshita, 1913  
 Chrysogorgia orientalis Versluys, 1902  
Chrysogorgia papillosa Kinoshita, 1913
Chrysogorgia pellucida Kükenthal, 1908
Chrysogorgia pendula Versluys, 1902
Chrysogorgia pentasticha Versluys, 1902
Chrysogorgia pusilla Versluys, 1902
Chrysogorgia pyramidalis Kükenthal, 1908
Chrysogorgia quadruplex Thomson, 1927
Chrysogorgia ramosa Versluys, 1902
Chrysogorgia rigida Versluys, 1902
Chrysogorgia rotunda Kinoshita, 1913
Chrysogorgia scintillans Bayer & Stefani, 1988
Chrysogorgia sibogae Versluys, 1902
Chrysogorgia sphaerica Aurivillius, 1931
Chrysogorgia spiculosa (Verrill, 1883)
Chrysogorgia squamata (Verrill, 1883)
Chrysogorgia stellata Nutting, 1908
Chrysogorgia tetrasticha Versluys, 1902
Chrysogorgia thyrsiformis Deichmann, 1936
Chrysogorgia tricaulis Pante & Watling, 2011
Chrysogorgia tuberculata Cordeiro, Castro & Pérez, 2015
Chrysogorgia upsilonia Cordeiro, Castro & Pérez, 2015
Chrysogorgia versluysi Kinoshita, 1913

References 

 van Ofwegen, L.; Grasshoff, M.; van der Land, J. (2001). Octocorallia (excl. Pennatulacea), in: Costello, M.J. et al. (Ed.) (2001). European register of marine species: a check-list of the marine species in Europe and a bibliography of guides to their identification. Collection Patrimoines Naturels, 50: pp. 104–105

External links 
 

 
 Chrysogorgia Duchassaing & Michelotti, 1864 at World Register of Marine Species

Chrysogorgiidae
Octocorallia genera